Fox 7 may refer to:

Television stations in the United States affiliated with Fox

Current affiliates
 KAII-TV in Wailuku, Hawaii
 Satellite of KHON-TV in Honolulu, Hawaii	
 KEVN-LD, Rapid City, South Dakota
 KPPI-LD2, Saipan, Northern Mariana Islands
 Satellite of KTGM in Tamuning, Guam
 KTBC, Austin, Texas (O&O)
 WSVN, Miami–Fort Lauderdale, Florida

Formerly affiliated
 K07UU/KFXF, Fairbanks, Alaska (1992 to 2017)
 KBZK, Bozeman, Montana (1996 to 2000)
 Was a satellite of KXLF-TV in Butte, Montana	
 KTTW, Sioux Falls, South Dakota (2009 to 2020)
 WTVW, Evansville, Indiana (1995 to 2011)
 WTRF-DT2, Wheeling, West Virginia (2017 to 2014)

Other uses
 FOX-7 (1,1-diamino-2,2-dinitroethene [DADNE]), an insensitive high explosive compound